Joaquín Alejandro Furriel (born August 26, 1974) is an Argentine actor.

Biography
Joaquín Furriel was born on August 26, 1974, in Buenos Aires, Argentina, but he grew up in Adrogué, Gran Buenos Aires. At the age of thirteen, he participated in the theater in an existing workshop in his school and from then joined the Comedia de Almirante Brown. Years later, he studied at the Conservatorio de Arte Dramático and this allowed him to participate in international festivals.

Career
He has worked in the telenovela Entre caníbales. His performance in the movie Lighthouse of the Orcas (El Faro de Las Orcas) has been pronounced worthy of accolades.

Personal life 
In 2005, he started a relationship with the actress Paola Krum. They married and after six years divorced on May 24, 2011. They have a daughter named Eloísa Furriel Krum. 

In 2015, he suffered a Stroke.

From 2016 to 2018, he was in a relationship with the actress Eva De Dominici.

Filmography

Theater

Television

Movies

Television program

Awards

References

Argentine male telenovela actors
1974 births
Living people